Routhier is a surname. Notable people with the surname include:

Adolphe-Basile Routhier (1839–1920), Canadian judge, author, and lyricist
Félix Routhier (1827–1891), Ontario businessman and political figure
Karen Routhier (born 1991), Canadian ice dancer
Marie Routhier, the owner and designer of IQ Sportswear Inc. in Newfoundland